Coelites  is a Southeast Asia genus of butterfly in the family Nymphalidae (Satyrinae)

The genus contains three species:

Coelites nothis Westwood, [1850]
C. n. nothis Assam, Burma, Thailand, Laos
C. n. sylvarum Fruhstorfer, 1902 North Vietnam
C. n. adamsoni Moore, 1891 Assam, Burma
C. n. hainanensis Gu, 1994 Hainan
Coelites epiminthia Westwood, [1851]
C. e. epiminthia Westwood, [1851] Peninsular Malaya, Sumatra, Borneo
C. e.  binghami Moore, 1891 South Burma
C. e. vicinus Felder Sulawesi
Coelites euptychioides C. & R. Felder, [1867]
C. e. euptychioides C. & R. Felder, [1867] Malaya, Sumatra, Borneo
C. e. humilis Butler, 1867 Peninsular Malaya, Sumatra

References
"Coelites Westwood, [1850]" at Markku Savela's Lepidoptera and Some Other Life Forms

External links
Images representing Coelites at  Consortium for the Barcode of Life

Satyrinae
Butterfly genera
Taxa named by John O. Westwood